Sacred Arias is the sixth album by Welsh mezzo-soprano Katherine Jenkins, released on 20 October 2008 in the UK. It is her final album with the Universal Music label.

A Deluxe Edition containing a second disc was also released. This contains the first chapter of Jenkins' autobiography, Time to Say Hello, read by Jenkins herself.

After the first week of release Sacred Arias was at number 5 on the UK Albums Chart.

Track listing
 "Abide with Me" (Henry Francis Lyte, arr. Simon Franglen) - 4:36
 "Pie Jesu" (Andrew Lloyd Webber) - 3:39
 "The Lord is My Shepherd" (Howard Goodall/Sacred text) - 2:57
 "Down in the River to Pray" (Traditional, arr. Steven Baker, Simon Franglen) - 3:00
 "May the Good Lord Bless and Keep You" (Meredith Willson) - 4:36
 "Hallelujah" (Leonard Cohen) - 4:47
 "Panis angelicus" (César Franck, arr. Simon Franglen) - 2:40
 "In Paradisum" (Gabriel Fauré, arr. Simon Franglen) - 3:14
 "Silent Night" (Franz Gruber, arr. Simon Franglen, Nicholas Dodd, Joseph Mohr) - 4:41
 "Ave Maria" (Simon Lindley) - 3:51
 "Misa Criolla: Kyrie" (Ariel Ramírez, arr. Alejandro Mayol, Osvaldo Armando Catena, Jesús Gabriel Segrad) - 3:54
 "Agnus Dei" (Samuel Barber) - 6:28

Personnel 
 Simon Franglen - producer, arrangement, keyboards and programming
 Jon Bailey - engineer and mixer
 Nick Cervonaro - assistant engineer
 Geoff Foster - engineer
 Chris Barrett - assistant engineer
 Tony Cousins - mastered by, at Metropolis Mastering
 Andrew Lloyd Webber - orchestral arrangement
 Howard Goodall - orchestral arrangement
 Nicholas Dodd - orchestral arrangement and conductor
 Daniel Roberts - music transcription
Jonathan Rathbone - music transcription
 Steve Baker - piano, organ, music transcription and choral arrangement
 The London Session Orchestra
 Isobel Griffiths - orchestral contractor
 The Crouch End Festival Chorus
 David Temple - musical director and conductor
 Geoffrey Kemball-Cook - music librarian
 Steve James - general manager
 Tony Wren - arrangements manager
 James Fitzpatrick - choral contractor
 The Rodolfus Choir
 Ralph Allwood - musical director and conductor
 James Oldfield - choir manager
 Steffan Hughes - treble
 Gary Kettel - traditional tenor drum

Charts

Weekly charts

Year-end charts

Certifications

References

Katherine Jenkins albums
2008 classical albums
Universal Classics and Jazz albums